Lowrell Simon (March 18, 1943, Chicago – June 19, 2018, Newton, Mississippi) was an American soul singer. He began as a singer in The LaVondells, which became The Vondells which featured Butch McCoy and Jessie Dean and enjoyed some regional success in the 1960s with the song "Lenore". When the Vondells broke up, Simon formed the group The Lost Generation alongside several Chicago friends, and the group scored several U.S. hits between 1969 and 1974. After the band's breakup, Simon made contributions to the soundtrack to the 1974  film, Three the Hard Way, and wrote tracks for the 1976 debut album of Mystique, which featured other former members of The Lost Generation. He also wrote the tune "Dance Master" in 1974 for Willie Henderson, and the 1979 tune "All About the Paper" for Loleatta Holloway.

In the late 1970s, Simon began recording under his first name. He signed to Liberace's label, AVI Records, and released an album in late 1979 entitled Lowrell. The album's second single, "Mellow Mellow Right On" b/w "You're Playing Dirty", was a No. 32 U.S. R&B  hit that year. It reached No. 37 in the UK Singles Chart in December 1979. The song has been sampled copiously, including by Massive Attack, Imagination, Big Brooklyn Red on "Taking It Too Far" and Common, and has been covered by the dance production outfit L.A. Mix.

References

1943 births
2018 deaths
20th-century African-American musicians
American soul musicians
American male singers
Songwriters from Illinois
Singers from Chicago
American male songwriters